Metrovacesa S.A. is a major Spanish property company, headquartered in Madrid, which was the largest publicly traded real estate developer in the Eurozone. The company is primarily focused on the leasing of a range of property in France and Spain, which comprises around 80% of its portfolio.

History
The origins of Metrovacesa can be traced back to 1918 and the foundation in Madrid of the construction firm Urbanizadora Metropolitana, which was one of three companies (Compañía Urbanizadora Metropolitana, Compañía Inmobiliaria Metropolitana and Vacesa) which merged in 1989 to form Metropolitana Vasco Central (Metrovacesa). The interests of the three constituent companies were largely confined to residential and office property, but the newly merged entity expanded across Spain and moved into other assets such as shopping centres and car parks. A merger with the housing development firm BAMI followed in 2000, and the group acquired a majority stake in Gecina, the largest French real estate company, in 2005.

In April 2007 Metrovacesa made headlines by paying £1.09 billion for the  HSBC skyscraper (8 Canada Square) in London's Canary Wharf complex, the biggest ever single-property deal in the UK. In a move to combat the firm's rising debt, the building was however sold back to HSBC at a £250 million loss in December 2008.

On 14 September 2007 Metrovacesa announced their purchase of the new Walbrook Square development from Legal & General for the sum of £240m (€350m). They planned to invest a further €1400m, and announced that all work was to be completed by 2015. Metrovacesa were to hold the rights for a 250-year lease. However, after they were unable to continue paying their instalments, on 31 July 2009 they agreed to pay Legal & General £100 million in order to exit the contract.
In February 2009, following a €738m loss in the previous year, Metrovacesa's owners were forced to hand control to its creditor banks, swapping a 55% stake for a cancellation of €2.1bn of loans which it could neither repay nor refinance.  In 2010 it was the largest shareholder of Gecina (28%).

In 2009, Metrovacesa invested $70 million on the development of the mall Las Arenas de Barcelona, which opened in March 2011.

Metrovacesa's recorded net losses was €89.9M in 2010, and €144.7M in 2011.

In December 2012, Metrovacesa was delisted from the Spanish stockmarket.

In 2012, the Sanahuja family, owner of more than 80 percent of Metrovacesa, is now in talk with Banco Santander and Banco Español de Crédito regarding the company's €4bn debt, and 54% of Metrovacesa's shares could land in the banks' hands.

In June 2016, Metrovacesa merged its activities with the Spanish group Merlin to create the leading real estate Spanish company. The tertiary real estate was concentrated within Merlin's portfolio (9,317 million euros), and the housing real estate were transferred to Metrovacesa which was renamed Testa Residencial (980 million euros). The banking consortium Santander/BBVA y Popular hold a 31.2% stake in Merlin, and 65,7% in Testa Residencial.

Activities
Metrovacesa's portfolio currently comprises a significant number of office blocks, business parks and housing for rent, located primarily in Madrid, Barcelona and Île-de-France, as well as around ten car parks, a similar number of hotels and two residences for the elderly located across Spain.

The company has branched into Düsseldorf and Frankfurt in Germany, as well as London. It is owned by Banco Santander (72.5%) and by BBVA (19.4%). In November 2015 it was said to be soon divided into two.

References

External links
Official site

Real estate companies of Spain
Companies based in the Community of Madrid